ATRM or atrm may refer to:

 Aetrium, a company, by NASDAQ stock ticker
 atrm, a Unix at computer command
 AT&T SportsNet Rocky Mountain

See also
 aTrm56, an enzyme